Chattal is a village located in Chak Malook union council of Chakwal District in the Punjab Province of Pakistan, it is part of Chakwal Tehsil.
It is a village located approximately  Chakwal, Punjab, Pakistan  on the Chakwal-Jehlum road.

Education
Schools in this village include:
 Minhas Public Model School
 Government Girls Elementary School
 Government Primary School

Entry Gate
Entry Gate of Chattal was made in the memory of Brigadier Sultan Amir Tarar who was executed in captivity, as documented in a video released by Tehreek-i-Taliban Pakistan.

Notable residents
Colonel Imam – Sultan Amir Tarar

References

Populated places in Chakwal District